Heart Colchester (formerly SGR Colchester) was a radio station broadcasting to Colchester and the surrounding areas. The station was launched in 1993 as SGR Colchester by the East Anglian Radio group, which also operated the Ipswich-based SGR-FM, Radio Broadland in Norwich, and Amber Radio across Suffolk and Norfolk.

History 
The station, serving a population of around 150,000, broadcast programmes from its studios in the town during daytime (6am - 6pm) but shared output from its larger sister SGR station in Ipswich at other times. The Colchester station was an immediate success and quickly built an impressive audience locally, soon establishing itself as market leader. Staff in the early years included Mike Stewart (group programme director), Danny Cox (station manager) and presenters Nick Jackson and Simon Taylor.

It became part of the GWR Group when East Anglian Radio was taken over in 1996. In January 2009, owners Global Radio re-branded SGR Colchester as Heart Colchester and the following year, it was merged with Heart Essex, resulting in the closure of the station's studio base in the town.

See also
Heart Ipswich
Global Radio

External links 
 

Radio stations in Essex
Colchester (town)
Radio stations established in 1993
Colchester
Defunct radio stations in the United Kingdom
1993 establishments in England